Zhadan i Sobaky (Zhadan and The Dogs) is a Ukrainian ska band from Kharkiv. It was created in 2000 and named "Sobaky v kosmosi" (literally - "Dogs in the Outer Space"). After a long-term cooperation with Ukrainian writer Serhiy Zhadan the band was renamed to "Zhadan i Sobaky".

History 
The band was created in 2000. As of 2008 it has released two studio albums and has taken part in different Ukrainian festivals such as "Tavriyski ihry", "Raz. Liv", "Muzychyi Ostriv", "5 ozer", "MazepaFest", "Den Nezalezhnosti z Makhnom".

Since 2008 Sobaky v Kosmosi has collaborated with a famous Kharkiv-based writer Serhiy Zhadan. They have written two studio albums in cooperation (labeled as "Serhiy Zhadan i Sobaky v Kosmosi"), and two more as a united band named "Zhadan i Sobaky" (Zhadan and The Dogs). Zhadan is lead vocalist and lyrics author. Altogether they have released four studio albums.

Members 
 Oleksandr Boldyryev (vocals, guitar)
 Andriy Pyvovarov (bass, vocals)
 Ivan Pirozhok (trombone)
 Viktor Kondratov (drums)
 Artem Dmytrychenkov (trumpet)
 Serhiy Kulayenko (keyboards)

Discography 
 Vafli (Вафли, 2002)
 Gruppa ishchet Prodyusera (Группа ищет Продюсера, 2008)

In a collaboration with Serhiy Zhadan
 Sportyvnyi klub armiyi (Спортивний клуб армії, 2008)
 Zbroya proletariatu (Зброя пролетаріату, 2012)
 Byisya za neyi (Бийся за неї, 2014)
 Psy (Пси, 2016).
 Madonna (Мадонна, 2019).

Links 

 Official page
 «Эротическое ска» от Андрея Пивоварова
  Тур Сергія Жадана та Собак у Космосі!
 "Byisya za neyi"

Ukrainian ska groups
Ukrainian rock music groups
Musical groups from Kharkiv
Musical groups established in 2000
2000 establishments in Ukraine